USS Ice King (ID 3160) was a refrigerated cargo ship (reefer ship) acquired by the U.S. Navy during World War I. She was assigned to transport cargo across the Atlantic Ocean to Allied troops in Europe. On her first transatlantic crossing, a German submarine fired torpedoes at her, but, through skillful maneuvering, her captain was able to avoid being struck and sunk. Post-war she was sold, and continued her civilian maritime career.

Requisitioned by the Navy 

Ice King, a 4715 gross ton (10,562 tons displacement) refrigerated cargo ship, was built at Shooters Island, New York, as part of the World War I shipbuilding effort. Ordered by the British as War Unit, she was requisitioned by the U.S. Shipping Board and renamed Passaic while under construction. The ship was taken over by the Navy at New York City on 2 July and commissioned on 5 July 1918.

She carried the name Passaic in 1918 but was renamed Ice King shortly before commissioning, probably by the Navy to avoid confusion with a tug named Passaic (later designated YT-20) that was already on the Navy List.

World War I service

Dodging U-Boat torpedoes 

USS Ice King departed Halifax, Nova Scotia on 18 July 1918 and arrived at Bordeaux, France, on 5 August with a cargo of over 2,500 tons of frozen beef, 200 tons of general cargo, and 20 trucks. While en route from Brest to Quiberon Bay 3 August, the ship maneuvered clear of two torpedoes from a German U-boat and then proceeded safely to her destination.

Transatlantic crossings 
Between September 1918 and May 1919 Ice King made four more round trip voyages between the United States and France, loading up to 3,000 tons frozen beef at Hoboken, New Jersey, for the eastbound voyage and returning with smaller U.S. Army return cargoes, including ammunition. Ice King was twice delayed in French ports, once by a shortage of refrigerated railcars and once by port congestion.

Post-war decommissioning 
USS Ice King was decommissioned and returned to the Shipping Board at New York City on 26 May 1919.

Subsequent maritime career 
As S.S. Ice King, the ship began commercial service later in 1919 while owned by the Shipping Board, with port calls including Hook of Holland in August and Goteborg, Sweden in September 1919. In 1920 the Shipping Board transferred her to the French American Line of New York, but this arrangement was short lived.

Before the end of the year she was back in Shipping Board hands, where she remained until she was sold and renamed Georgian in 1928. Renamed Hilton in 1936, she was finally scrapped at Wilmington, Delaware, in 1951.

References 

 
 USS Ice King (ID # 3160), 1918-1919. Previously S.S. War Unit, Passaic and Ice King (American Refrigerated Cargo Ship, 1918). Later S.S. Ice King, Georgian, and Hilton

World War I auxiliary ships of the United States
Standard World War I ships
Steamships of the United States
Ships built in Staten Island
1917 ships
Cargo ships of the United States Navy